Catephia albomacula is a species of moth of the family Erebidae. It is found in China.

References

Catephia
Moths described in 1928
Moths of Asia